Barbeque King is an album that Jorma Kaukonen of Hot Tuna and Jefferson Airplane recorded in 1980 with his then-current band Vital Parts.  It was the last album Kaukonen recorded on RCA, as poor sales prompted them dropping him from the label.

Track listing

Side A
"Runnin' with the Fast Crowd"  (Wilcey, Denny DeGorio) – 2:52
"Man for All Seasons" (Jorma Kaukonen, DeGorio) – 3:34
"Starting Over Again" (Kaukonen, DeGorio, David Kahne, John Stench) – 3:16
"Milkcow Blues Boogie" (Kokomo Arnold) – 3:02
"Road and Roads &" (Kaukonen) – 4:23

Side B
"Love Is Strange" (Ethel Smith, Mickey Baker) – 3:32
"To Hate Is to Stay Young" (Kaukonen) – 3:02
"Rockabilly Shuffle" (Kaukonen) – 2:42
"Snout Psalm" (Kaukonen, DeGorio) – 3:12
"Barbeque King" (Kaukonen, John Stench) –  3:57

The original acoustic version of "Roads and Roads &" appeared on Jorma Kaukonen's second solo album Jorma.

Personnel
Jorma Kaukonen – guitars, vocals
Denny DeGorio – bass
John Stench – drums

Additional Personnel
Hilary Stench – bass on "Starting Over Again"
Mike Butera – saxophone on "Love Is Strange"
Larry Whitman, Steve Huff – backing vocals on "Runnin' with the Fast Crowd" and "Starting Over Again"

Production
David Kahne – producer, engineer
Wayne Lewis, La'ertes Lee Muldrow – second engineers
Recorded at The Automatt, San Francisco
Mastered by John Golden at Kendun Recorders
Bill Thompson – manager
Jacky Kaukonen – secretary
Lora Lovrien – publicity

References

Jorma Kaukonen albums
1980 albums
Albums produced by David Kahne
RCA Records albums